Collatus is a genus of very small and minute sea snails with an operculum, marine gastropod mollusks in the family Vitrinellidae.

Species
 Carinatus bicarinatus Rubio & Rolán, 2020
 Carinatus fijiensis Rubio & Rolán, 2020
 Carinatus gracilis Rubio & Rolán, 2020
 Carinatus ministriatus Rubio & Rolán, 2020
 Carinatus obesus Rubio & Rolán, 2020
 Carinatus regius Rubio & Rolán, 2020
 Carinatus simplex Rubio & Rolán, 2020
 Carinatus variabilis Rubio & Rolán, 2020

References

 Rubio F. & Rolán E. (2020). Carinatus, a new genus for the family Vitrinellidae (Gastropoda, Truncatelloidea) from the Pacific Ocean, with the description of 8 new species. Xenophora Taxonomy. 30: 47-54.

External links
 

Vitrinellidae